Kaare Walberg (July 3, 1912 – February 29, 1988) was a Norwegian ski jumper who won a bronze medal in the Individual Large Hill at the 1932 Winter Olympics in Lake Placid, New York. At the 1936 Winter Olympics in Garmisch-Partenkirchen, he finished fourth. He also finished fifth in the Individual Normal Hill at the 1931 Nordic skiing World Championships.

External links
 
 

1912 births
1988 deaths
Norwegian male ski jumpers
Olympic ski jumpers of Norway
Olympic bronze medalists for Norway
Ski jumpers at the 1932 Winter Olympics
Ski jumpers at the 1936 Winter Olympics
Olympic medalists in ski jumping
Medalists at the 1932 Winter Olympics
20th-century Norwegian people